Oldies-33 was a subsidiary of Vee-Jay Records.  It was started in 1963 to distribute their old 33rpm records.

See also
 List of record labels

Defunct record labels of the United States
Record labels established in 1963